In mathematics, Carleman's equation is a Fredholm integral equation of the first kind with a logarithmic kernel.  Its solution was first given by Torsten Carleman in 1922.
The equation is

 

The solution for b − a ≠ 4 is

 

If b − a = 4 then the equation is solvable only if the following condition is satisfied

 

In this case the solution has the form

 

where C is an arbitrary constant.

For the special case f(t) = 1 (in which case it is necessary to have b − a ≠ 4), useful in some applications, we get

References
 CARLEMAN, T. (1922) Uber die Abelsche Integralgleichung mit konstanten Integrationsgrenzen. Math. Z., 15, 111–120
 Gakhov, F. D., Boundary Value Problems [in Russian], Nauka, Moscow, 1977
 A.D. Polyanin and A.V. Manzhirov, Handbook of Integral Equations, CRC Press, Boca Raton, 1998. 

Fredholm theory
Integral equations